Gasparilla may refer to:

Gasparilla Pirate Festival, a large parade and related events held annually in Tampa, Florida
José Gaspar, also known as Gasparilla, a Spanish pirate from Florida folklore for whom the festival is named
Gasparilla Bowl, a college football post-season game played in Tampa, Florida
Gasparilla Island, an island near the mouth of Charlotte Harbor in southwest Florida

See also

Gasparillo (disambiguation)
Gaspar (disambiguation)